Peddlers may refer to:
 Peddler, a travelling vendor of goods
 Peddlers (film), a 2012 Indian film
 The Peddlers, British music group